Lesotho have competed in eleven Commonwealth Games, beginning in 1974 and missing only the 1982 Games. Their first medal was a gold medal in the men's marathon, won by Thabiso Moqhali in 1998.

Medals

Medalists

References

 
Nations at the Commonwealth Games